Diane Hutchinson (also O'Connor) is a fictional character from the British Channel 4 soap opera Hollyoaks, played by Alex Fletcher. In 2010, Hollyoaks series producer, Paul Marquess, embarked on the show's rejuvenation and axed a number of cast members. To compensate for the departures, the character of Diane and her family were created and introduced. Fletcher's casting was announced in June 2010 and she began filming her scenes in the same month. The actress said working on the show is practical as she does not have to relocate. She made her first on-screen appearance on 1 September 2010. Diane was introduced with her husband, Rob (Gary Cargill) and stepchildren, Sinead (Stephanie Davis) and Finn (Connor Wilkinson/Keith Rice). The O'Connors were one of three families introduced throughout the year.

Diane is described as a "loving wife" and a "devoted stepmum". Diane is a little bit over the top, but Fletcher hoped that she would be quite likeable. Diane is a marketing worker. Fletcher explained that Diane has a great relationship with Sinead and Finn and that she did not want Diane to be "the wicked stepmother". Diane's storylines have mainly focused on her desperation to have her own child. She undergoes a second round of In vitro fertilisation (IVF) treatment. Fletcher said that she really wanted to get the storyline right because it affects so many people. She added that she feels she has a "huge responsibility" to do the storyline justice. Diane's second round of IVF fails and she breaks down, subsequently stealing a baby boy from the hospital. Her other storylines have involved splitting from Rob, coping with Sinead's erratic behaviour, protecting and defending Finn after he rapes John Paul McQueen (James Sutton), marrying Tony Hutchinson (Nick Pickard), for whom she knew him since they were kids, giving birth to twins, the discovery that her and Tegan Lomax's (Jessica Ellis) babies were swapped at birth and her feud with Tegan, being secretly poisoned by her nephew Scott Drinkwell (Ross Adams), the discovery that she had an affair with Scott's father and caused the breakdown of his family, a friendship with schemer Marnie Nightingale (Lysette Anthony), inadvertently selling The Hutch to Marnie and leaving for her dream job in France. Later storylines saw Diane embarking on an affair with her father-in-law Edward Hutchinson (Joe McGann) which results in a pregnancy, giving birth to Edward's daughter Eva, which results in her developing OCD, and becoming a suspect when Mercedes McQueen (Jennifer Metcalfe) is shot in a "whodunit" storyline.

The character went on a brief hiatus in autumn 2015. Diane's last appearance was on 28 October 2015, however, the character returned to screens on 2 February 2016. In March 2016, Fletcher announced her pregnancy and that she would be taking maternity leave, not confirming whether or not she would return to Hollyoaks after. Fletcher filmed her exit scenes in May 2016 and Diane's exit storyline saw her and Tony offered jobs in France in a restaurant, however when the day arrived, Tony stayed behind to help relapsed drug addict, Ste whilst Diane left for France. Diane's exit scenes aired on 13 July 2016. In December 2016, it was announced that Diane was to return in the New Year with her niece Lily Drinkwell, played by Lauren McQueen. Diane's return scenes aired on 4 January 2017. In 2018, Fletcher and Pickard were nominated for Best Partnership at the Inside Soap Awards.

Casting
In 2010, Hollyoaks acquired a new series producer, Paul Marquess. After his appointment, Marquess embarked on the show's rejuvenation and axed a number of cast members. Marquess revealed that many fantastic new characters had been created to compensate for the departures. Following the announcement of the new Sharpe and Costello families, Marquess told Inside Soap that a third new family would be introduced. The O'Connor family, described as a "four-member Liverpudlian tribe", were announced on 16 June 2010. It was announced that Fletcher had been cast in the role of step-mother of two, Diane. Gary Cargill was cast as Diane's husband, Rob, and Stephanie Davis and Connor Wilkinson were cast as her stepchildren, Sinead and Finn respectively. Of her role, Fletcher said, "I am delighted to be back filming at Lime Pictures where I started my career on Brookside - then Mersey TV. I worked with Paul on Brookside and I'm thrilled and honoured to be working with him again, especially as this is such an exciting time for Hollyoaks." Marquess commented, "We're very excited about the arrival of the O'Connors who burst onto screens in August with a very dramatic story-line. And I'm personally very excited to work with the fantastic Alex Fletcher again." Fletcher began filming her scenes in mid-June. She said working on the show is practical as she does not have to relocate.

Character development

Characterisation
Diane is described as a "loving wife" who is a "devoted stepmum". Fletcher told Daniel Kilkelly of Digital Spy that Diane is a good person as she has brought up two children who are not biologically hers. When asked how Diane compares to Jacqui Dixon, a character Fletcher played in Brookside, she said that Diane "hasn't got so much of a sting in her tail". Diane's career is important to her, but not as much as it was for Jacqui. Diane is a lot more sensitive and grown-up. Fletcher said that Diane is a little bit over the top, but hoped that she would be quite likeable. The actress added that she really wants people to like Diane and be able to relate to her. Diane is a marketing worker and is training to work for the local council. Fletcher explained to OK! that Diane is the "rock of the family". Fletcher explained that Diane has a great relationship with Sinead and Finn and that she did not want Diane to be "the wicked stepmother". In 2012, Fletcher told a reporter from K9 magazine that being a mother herself helped her connect with Diane and play a motherly role. She added that Diane is "a really caring person but a bit nosey with it" because she is always keeping "a beady eye on" Sinead.

IVF treatment storyline
Diane becomes desperate to have her own child and undergoes a second round of In vitro fertilisation (IVF) treatment. Fletcher told the Liverpool Echo that she really wanted to get the storyline right because it affects so many people. Fletcher added that she feels she has a "huge responsibility" to do the storyline justice. The actress later explained that Rob is not that keen on having any more children, because he already has children. Rob will do anything for Diane as she "pretty much stepped in and saved his life" with Sinead and Finn. The storyline looks at how Sinead and Finn cope with the pressure and disappointment of IVF and the potential arrival of a new baby brother or sister. Davis stated that Sinead is upset that Diane is desperate for a baby of her own. She said "I think she and her little brother are thinking, 'Well, aren't we good enough for you?' in a way." Davis added that Sinead is against Diane's IVF treatment. Fletcher called the storyline great because "there's just loads of avenues that they could take it down".

Diane's second round of IVF fails and she breaks down. Sinead comforts Diane, but Finn is glad as he "feels if Diane wants a baby it means she doesn't want him". Diane is "desperate" for a baby, and steals a baby boy from the hospital. She goes to the hospital to see a nurse and when she gets there, she finds the baby. Fletcher explained the situation to a reporter from What's on TV, saying "The baby has been abandoned outside the hospital. Diane thinks it's an animal at first when she hears something crying - and when she looks it's a baby boy." There is not a note left with the baby, so Diane reasons that his mother does not deserve to have him back and takes him home. Fletcher explained why Diane did not take the baby into the hospital: "She believes that, in taking him home, she's doing the right thing and that she'll get in touch with social services." But, Diane "goes past the point of no return" and feels a bond with the baby and falls in love with him. Fletcher defended Diane, saying "She's not a nut job. She's pumped full of hormones and the IVF hasn't worked. She's having a breakdown and she isn't thinking properly."

Temporary departure
In March 2016, Fletcher announced that she was pregnant and would be taking maternity leave from the show. This meant that the character had to be written out temporarily and she filmed the exit in May 2016. Diane's exit storyline saw herself and Tony forced to sell their restaurant to Marnie Nightingale (Lysette Anthony) following months of her scheming to ruin the business. Diane and Tony return to working there but are treated unfairly by Marnie. Diane discovers that Marnie is having an affair with her daughter's boyfriend, Freddie Roscoe (Charlie Clapham) and blackmails her. Marnie decides she needs to get rid of Diane and calls an old friend who offers her a job in France, which Diane accepts.

"Who Shot Mercedes?"

Hollyoaks announced that Diane would be a suspect for an upcoming whodunit storyline, which sees Mercedes McQueen (Jennifer Metcalfe) being shot and left for dead by a mystery assailant.

Diane is motivated after, in May 2019, Mercedes frames her stepson, Harry Thompson (Parry Glasspool), for a hit and run which left Grace Black (Tamara Wall) paralysed and then believes she killed him, in July, to make sure she is not exposed.

Storylines
Diane completes a round of In vitro fertilisation treatment and takes a pregnancy test, which reveals she is not pregnant. She goes to the hospital to discuss other options for conceiving children and returns with a baby boy. Diane tells her stepdaughter, Sinead, that the baby was abandoned at the hospital. Diane intends to raise the baby as her own, however he becomes ill and Sinead tells nurse, Lynsey Nolan (Karen Hassan). Lynsey discovers the truth and attempts to return the baby, but Diane refuses to hand him over. Lynsey threatens to report Diane to the police, but Anita Roy (Saira Choudhry) forces Lynsey to hand the baby over to Diane. Diane learns that teenager, Amber Sharpe (Lydia Lloyd-Henry), is pregnant and planning to terminate her pregnancy. Amber agrees to have the baby and let Diane raise it as her own. Diane discovers that her stepson, Finn, is the father of Amber's baby and tells Amber that she cannot raise the baby.

Eva Strong (Sheree Murphy) wrongly assumes that Diane's husband, Rob, is having an inappropriate relationship with her daughter, Anita, and reports him to the police. After Rob is arrested, Diane admits that he was her teacher at school when they began a relationship. It transpires that when they began a relationship, Rob was married to Sinead and Finn's mother, Morag (Lisa Coleman). Diane reveals to Sinead that Morag is alive and not dead as first thought. Diane explains that learning of the revelation made her steal the baby from the hospital months earlier. Diane and Rob end their marriage, leaving Diane and Sinead's relationship strained. Diane tries to stop Sinead from seeing her boyfriend, Bart McQueen (Jonny Clarke), after she becomes intoxicated the night before an examination. Sinead and Bart continue their relationship in secret. Diane discovers this and becomes angry with Sinead. Diane finds a note left by Sinead telling her that she and Bart have run away. Diane finds Sinead, but after she insults Bart, Sinead slaps her and refuses to return home. Diane and Sinead reconcile and she agrees to accept Bart is part of Sinead's life.

Sinead is involved in a bus crash which kills her friends, Diane is left shocked when the nurse reveals that Sinead is pregnant. Diane begins teaching at Hollyoaks College and is completely unaware that Sinead and Ruby Button (Anna Shaffer) are bullying Esther Bloom (Jazmine Franks) following the bus crash. Diane asks Sinead whether she was involved in the bullying and she denies it and blames Ruby. New headteacher Patrick Blake (Jeremy Sheffield) promotes Diane to head of the Anti-Bullying scheme, but she is left shocked when Ruby reveals to Diane that Sinead was also involved in the bullying. Diane kicks Ruby out of her home and she is run over by Jack Osborne's (Jimmy McKenna) car. Ruby does not sustain any serious injuries and returns home the next day. Diane and Sinead agree to keep her involvement in the bullying secret but is caught out when Dylan Shaw's (Mikey Riddington-Smith) video of Esther is shown at The Dog, the video reveals her bullies in front of Patrick. Some time later, Diane has a drunken one-night stand with Tony Hutchinson (Nick Pickard) and embarrassed upon her awakening, she secretly leaves his bedroom nonetheless Tony notices. Diane is stunned to discover her pregnancy after. Sinead gives birth to a baby girl, who she calls Katy O'Connor.

Diane and Tony enter a relationship during Diane's pregnancy and open up a family business together, along with Ste Hay (Kieron Richardson), called The Hutch. As Diane nears her due date, her and Tony visit Brighton. They then discover that they met when children there, before Diane goes into labor and gives birth to twins, whom the pair name Anthony and Dee Dee Hutchinson. They return to the village as a family, but their life is far from peaceful. Diane is shocked to discover that Sinead has turned to prostitution to keep herself afloat, and forces her to move in with her, Tony and Finn to avoid suffering financial difficulty. Unbeknownst to Diane, Finn rapes his teacher John Paul McQueen (James Sutton) after a long while of homophobic bullying, but Diane maintains the image that her son is well behaved. When Sinead enters a relationship with Freddie Roscoe (Charlie Clapham), Sinead moves in with him and takes baby Katy with her. However, Katy falls ill and Sinead rushes her to the hospital, but nurse Lindsey Butterfield (Sophie Austin) insists there is nothing wrong with the baby and discharges her, believing she is trying to gain attention. Without Diane knowing, Sinead cuts her own finger and places her blood inside baby Katy's nappy to ensure she gets checked out properly, but Sinead later confesses this to Diane. Diane reveals the truth and social services take away baby Katy and place her into care. Diane then fosters baby Katy to keep her granddaughter close and warns Sinead to stay away. Diane and Tony then prepare to marry, but during the wedding, she is arrested for possession of drugs, which belong to Trevor Royle (Greg Wood). Diane returns from the police station to find Katy convulsing in her cot, and is attacked by Sinead in the street for not believing her. Sinead is arrested for assault and Diane rushes Katy to the hospital. Diane is then informed that baby Katy died and Finn reveals that he allowed Sinead to see Katy whilst Diane was in police custody, shortly before Katy was found convulsing. Diane is disgusted with Sinead and believes that she poisoned Katy to finally get attention.

Diane bans Sinead from attending Katy's funeral, much to the horror of Sinead and Freddie. Freddie fights for Diane to allow Sinead to go, but Diane refuses and attends the funeral herself. Sinead then receives news of Katy's postmortem, which reveal she had an underlying heart condition and was not poisoned Sinead shows up at the funeral and publicly humiliates Diane and slaps her, before ordering everybody to leave the funeral so she can have time alone with Katy's coffin. Diane is desperate to make amends with Sinead and begs for forgiveness on several occasions, and eventually Sinead relents and forgives her. However, this is revealed to be fake and Sinead is secretly planning even worse revenge on Diane. Diane and Sinead discover Finn looking at a video that he filmed of him violently attacking Blessing Chambers (Modupe Adeyeye) because she was a transgender, and Sinead is adamant that they should hand Finn in, but Diane refuses and deletes the file, saving Finn and implicating Finn's innocent friend Robbie Roscoe (Charlie Wernham) in the process. Secretly, Sinead seduces Tony in order to get revenge on Diane for good for not believing her over Katy's death, but she ends up falling for Tony and the two embark on an affair in secret. Diane is horrified when John Paul then reveals that Finn raped him after Finn attempts to rape Nancy Osborne (Jessica Fox) - but firmly supports her son. Diane and Tony are subjected to a hate campaign from the McQueens because of this and The Hutch is vandalized several times. During the trial, Diane continues to support Finn when he claims John Paul raped him, but eventually realises the truth and Finn is found guilty of John Paul's rape. She is devastated when Finn refuses to see her and breaks down to John Paul over it, apologising to him for everything she and Finn did in the process. Diane is injured after being attacked by Ste when he attempts to steal from The Hutch to fuel his drug habit, but makes a full recovery and remains unaware of Sinead and Tony's affair.

When Diane nearly catches Sinead and Tony kissing, Sinead suggests to Tony they go away for a weekend. Tony lies to Diane and tells her he's going to a food conference and goes to a hotel with Sinead. Diane is worried when the flat alarm goes off and Tony is away and not available to fix it, and the alarm persists in annoying the whole village. Trevor suggests Diane look at Tony's credit card details to find out where he is staying and she tracks him down to a hotel. However, Tony is there and promises to come home, leaving Sinead behind. Diane shows up to question the hotel on who Tony was staying with, however the receptionist refuses to give any information other than Tony was with another woman. Tony is forced to admit that he is having an affair and Sinead says she went to the hotel to confront him about it. Diane is devastated, but forgives Tony and puts their wedding back on. On her hen night, Diane discovers Sinead is pregnant and confronts her about the father. Sinead informs her that it was her fling, Daryl (Rhys Howells) who fathered her child, so Diane invites him to her wedding to Tony. However, when Diane learns from Daryl that he and Sinead never slept together, she realises that Tony and Sinead are having an affair when she spots them looking at each other in the church. Diane publicly embarrasses them both and changes the locks on the flat and The Hutch, seeking support from Lockie Campbell (Nick Rhys). Diane refuses to forgive Sinead when Sinead tells her the affair was in revenge for Diane not believing her about baby Katy's death, but later rushes to apologise to Sinead afterwards. She finds Sinead and Tony in an embrace and so storms off and has sex with Lockie. Diane soon regrets what she has done and apologises to Lockie. After her affair, Lockie's wife Porsche McQueen (Twinnie Lee Moore) discovers that she had slept with Lockie whilst decorating Diane's room. The pair fight and Diane slips on wallpaper and falls out of the window. Diane regains consciousness in the hospital and Dr. Charles S'avage (Andrew Greenough) informs her that she has broken her ribs. Tegan Lomax (Jessica Ellis) injects her with morphine to take away the pain and she tells her that she had seen Tegan on a video informing Dee Dee that she is her real mother. During the night, the Gloved Hand Killer (who is Lindsey Butterfield) gains entry to Diane's ward and injects her with potassium chloride, the same chemical the assailant used to kill Rick Spencer (Victor Gardener) and Will Savage (James Atherton). Diane's heart monitor drops to 0 and the unknown assailant leaves the ward and leaves Diane for dead. Diane is rushed into resuscitation and soon makes a full recovery, after suffering a heart attack from the potassium chloride.

She discovers that Tegan is Dee Dee's biological mother, and refuses to help Tegan when she needs a bone marrow transplant to cure her leukaemia when Dee Dee is identified as a match. While Diane is asleep, Tony takes Dee Dee to hospital and gives his consent to allow her bone marrow to be transplanted into Tegan, who is close to death. Tegan recovers, and Diane is furious with both Tony and Tegan for their lies. She sees a solicitor and attempts to keep custody of Dee Dee while taking Rose Lomax away from Tegan. However, Tegan discovers this on her sister's wedding day and misses the ceremony trying to persuade Diane not to go through with it. She agrees not to and Tegan continues bringing up Rose while Diane and Tony look after Dee Dee.

A few months later, Diane and Tony discover that Rose has gone missing. Tony and Diane immediately set up a campaign to retrieve Rose from whoever has taken her. Whilst having a press conference to publicly broadcast the campaign, Tony panics and the press are convinced that Tony is Rose's kidnapper. The police later arrive and arrest Diane for Rose's abduction which she strongly denied doing. Scott and Tegan are later exposed as Rose's kidnappers and they later flee the village to avoid being found by the police. After a few weeks of hiding, the police arrive and tell Diane where Rose is. Diane and Tony arrive at Rose's location and are horrified to discover that Tegan had taken Rose. A custody hearing is then brought forward. Leela who is disgusted by Tegan's actions, gives Rose to Diane and Tony. In order to gain custody of Rose, Tegan begins blackmailing Diane along with Scott. Diane then begins to feel unwell and begins to take vitamin tablets. Tegan then begins to prescribe Diane with more tablets which make Diane worse. Diane then goes out to take Rose to the dentist but sees Tegan and Leela as she leaves her flat and Leela persuades Diane to let Tegan see Rose for a bit. Diane later passes out. As she awakes she finds out that Tegan and Rose have gone missing. She immediately calls the police. Tegan and Rose later arrive and Diane accuses Tegan of abducting Rose again. Tegan then reveals that she had taken Rose to the dentist herself. A few days later, Diane's illness begins to worsen more. As Tony gives her vitamin tablets and some water, Diane thinks that Tony is poisoning her as she again begins to feel unwell. Scott calls Tegan over to check up on her but she refuses and accuses Tegan of poisoning her. Diane shortly agrees to have Tegan check on her. Tegan makes Diane a cup of tea and Diane is still convinced that Tegan is poisoning her. Diane tells Scott that Tegan is poisoning her and she runs outside to attack Tegan. Diane steals Tegan's bag to find pills which are responsible for poisoning her. She finds nothing but she discovers that Tegan had stolen one of Rose's belongings. Tegan tells Diane why she had taken the belonging and Diane is then taken back inside by Tony. Diane then sets up a hidden video camera in her kitchen and then runs to the bathroom to vomit. As the camera records it captures someone replacing Diane's vitamin tablets with a poisoning substance in the form of pills. The culprit is then exposed as Scott who then finds Diane passed out on the bathroom floor.

In October, Diane becomes very angry at Ste for affair with her stepson Harry Thompson and finally knew the reasons why her daughter Sinead left the village. Right after this Diane forgives Tony, after she understands his affair with Sinead is the day of the death anniversary of his daughter Grace, and they decided to get married again. Just before the wedding, Tegan makes an emotional speech to Diane asking her how can she build her family when she's ripping apart Tegan's. Tegan then moves to leave knowing she's not welcome but Diane asks her to stay and admits that while she loves Rose their current situation isn't the way forward. Diane asks Tegan can they both play a part in their daughters lives. Tegan agrees and Diane sadly gives Rose back, ending Diane and Tony's six month feud with Tegan.

Diane later panics when she finds Scott passed out and when he says he drank from the cup of tea Tony left out for her, believes that Tony is poisoning her. However Tony grows suspicious and he and Diane search through Scott's room finding the pills he was using to poison her. Scott then reveals to Diane that he did it because she promised she'd be there for him growing up, but she left after his parents marriage fell apart because of his dad's affair and he got sent to be his nan's carer. Scott then apologies for what he's done and boards a bus waving to Diane as he leaves. Diane tracks him down and convinces him to return. She refuses to tell Tony why. Later while on her own, Diane tearfully looks at a silver necklace exactly like the one Scott describes as the one his father bought for his lover, revealing she was the one who was having an affair with his dad and ripped apart his family.

Diane and Tony are later offered the chance to work aboard in France, after they're forced to sell the Hutch to Marnie (Lysette Anthony) and James Nightingale (Gregory Finnigan). Following a heartbreaking farewell with Tegan, who passes up the opportunity to go to France with them, Diane and Tony prepare to leave for France. However, Harry stops them asking for help, revealing that Ste is back on drugs and that he can't deal with the fallout on his own. Tony stays behind to help Ste, whilst Diane leaves. Two months later, Tony called her and told her that Ste was now alright, but, told her that he was fighting custody of his kids.

Diane returns in the New Year, along with her niece Lily. Diane starts acting suspiciously and Lily suspects she is having an affair. It is revealed that she is in contact with Finn and he asks Diane to help with his parole. Tony is furious when he discovers this and confronts her. Diane gets James to help Finn with his parole but James is secretly trying to keep Finn in prison as he is John Paul's partner. Finn attacks James and is denied parole. Lily discovers that Diane was the one that broke up Scott's family after finding a jewellery box that Scott's dad gave her.

Diane is devastated when Scott is rushed to hospital after being found unconscious. She and Mercedes search through Scott's video camera to find clues and are horrified when they realise Scott tried to commit suicide. Diane angrily confronts Scott and calls him selfish before storming out. Scott discharges himself from hospital and tries to carry on as normal but breaks down and admits to Diane how unhappy he is. With the support of his family, Scott returns to hospital.

Diane is furious when Tony confesses to kissing his ex Mandy Richardson (Sarah Jayne Dunn) and furiously slaps her, warning her to stay away from her family. In an award-winning episode, focusing on three mothers, three daughters, headmistress Sally St. Claire (Annie Wallace) is suspicious that one of three girls Lily, Peri Lomax (Ruby O Donnell) and Yasmine Maalik (Haeisha Mistry) are self harming. She calls Diane, Leela Lomax (Kirsty Leigh Porter) and Misbah Maalik (Harvey Virdi) to the school to discuss the situation. They refuse to believe that there daughters might be self harming. Peri tells Sally that the article is fictional, unaware that all three girls are self harming. Diane is relieved that Lily is okay after an explosion at the school occurs. She heads to the Osbornes to tell Frankie Osborne (Helen Pearson) and finds her collapsed on the floor. She breaks the news to the Osbornes that Frankie is dead. Peri reveals that her, Yasmine and Lily have been self harming and Tony and Diane confront Lily over this and tell her that she needs help but she denies it. Lily later opens up to them and agrees to stop but secretly self harms behind closed doors.

In December 2017, Diane is shocked when she finds out that Lily is still self harming. Lily later collapses from Sepsis and is rushed to hospital. Diane comforts Lily in hospital and Lily explains why she is still self harming and Diane promises to help her through it and Lily finally agrees to stop. Diane is annoyed when Tony becomes distant and at the "come as you were party" Tony tells Diane that Harry killed Amy Barnes (Ashley Slanina-Davies), leaving Diane shocked. Diane struggles with this secret and reveals to Amy's husband Ryan Knight (Duncan James) that Harry killed Amy unaware that Ryan is the real killer. Ryan manipulates Diane into telling the police but James blackmails him into letting Harry off. Diane is angry when Tony wants Harry to move back in and gives him an ultimatum, either he goes to the police or she leaves. Diane goes to stay with her sister and Tony offers to take her unaware that he is smuggling Harry out of the village. While driving through a tunnel, Diane makes Tony stop after hearing noises in the boot. She opens it and finds Harry inside. A furious Diane decides to call the police but she steps onto the road and is hit by a car driven by Misbah and is thrown into the air. An emotional Diane allows Harry to run. Diane recovers but Harry is arrested by the police.

Diane is angry when she finds out that Lily's boyfriend Prince McQueen (Malique Thompson-Dwyer) cheated on her with Peri and got her pregnant. Diane fights with Leela in the street and Leela slaps her. When Peri finds out that she isn't pregnant, she tells Diane but Diane convinces Peri to pretend to be so Lily and Prince won't get back together. When the truth comes out, Lily proposes to Prince and he accepts, leaving Diane annoyed. She gives Lily her blessing but reveals to Scott that she is going to ruin the wedding. All of Diane's plans fail and she is horrified when Prince's dad kidnaps him on the day of the wedding but she decides to stay quiet. Prince manages to get to the church on time and Lily and Prince get married. Diane is confused when Dee Dee starts behaving badly and is horrified when she collapses at home. At the hospital, Misbah tells them it is not serious. When Misbah finds out about her behavior she researches her symptoms and is horrified when she realises it is much worse. Misbah rushes over to Diane's and tells them that Dee Dee may have autoimmune encephalitis. When the doctors reveal to Diane and Tony that the treatment isn't working they are forced to tell Dee Dee the truth. Diane and Tony fight when Tony suggests they tell Tegan but Diane is against it. Diane tells Tegan about Dee Dee's condition and allows her to be involved in her treatment. When Tegan suggests taking Dee Dee to Disneyland, Diane is against the idea. She is annoyed when Tegan decides to bring Disneyland to Dee Dee which causes her to fall ill. Diane cancels the party and Dee Dee tells her she wishes Tegan was her mum. Diane furiously bans Tegan from being involved with Dee Dee. Tegan responds by revealing she's going to tell Dee Dee that she is her real mum, shocking Diane. Diane and Tony try to convince Tegan to change her mind, but after seeing how much it is affecting Tegan, they decide to tell Dee Dee. However, just as they are about to tell her, Tegan arrives and tells them not to do it. Diane and Tony are devastated when doctors reveal Dee Dee will need possible fatal treatment to get better. Diane is reluctant to give her consent but Tony and Tegan persuade her to do it. Diane and Tony decide to stay strong for Ant, but after visiting Dee Dee in the hospital, Tony leaves the village, unable to deal with the heartache. Diane is worried when Tony doesn't return home and decides to report him missing. The police arrive and tell her that they found his phone discarded and all funds have been withdrawn from his account. Diane can't believe that Tony has abandoned her and tells Harry and Ste that Tony is no longer part of the family.

In September 2018, Diane is told that they are running out of options for Dee Dee but they have another treatment that can seriously hurt Dee Dee. Tegan is against the idea and seeks legal advice from James. Tony returns after Ste tracks him down and Diane lashes out at him for abandoning her but forgives him as it proved to traumatic for him due to his past. After being betrayed by Harry, James tells Dee Dee and Rose that their parents are not their real parents and Diane, Tony and Tegan are forced to tell the kids the truth. Diane and Tony are forced to allow Dee Dee to be put into a coma to stop her seizures. On Ste and Harry's wedding day, Diane and Tony are relieved when they find out that Dee Dee is going to be okay and Diane tells Tony that she wants to give their marriage another go. Later that day, a storm hits Hollyoaks and Diane and Tony find a frightened Rose at the Hutch. Tegan is hit be a falling tree and is rushed to hospital where Diane and Tony tell her that they want to co parent Dee Dee and Rose and Tegan agrees but later dies, devastating Diane. The next day, Diane is shocked when Sinead returns and tells her that Ste and Harry have split up.

Reception
For her portrayal of Diane, Fletcher was nominated for Best Soap Actor (Female) at the 2018 Digital Spy Reader Awards; she came in tenth place with 3.4% of the total votes. Daniel Kilkelly of Digital Spy said he was "pleased" about Fletcher's signing. Holy Soap have said Diane's most memorable moment is "Getting her step-daughter Sinead to administer her IVF injection when husband Rob was tied up at work." The official Hollyoaks website ran a poll asking viewers which member of the O'Connor family was their favourite. Diane received the most votes, with 1,597 (34.13%) people voting for her. In another poll run by In a poll run by Hollyoaks official website to discover the best mum out of Diane, Myra McQueen (Nicole Barber-Lane) and Martha Kane (Carli Norris), Diane came first with over 3920 votes, over 51% of the total votes.

References

External links
 Character profile at Channel4.com

Hollyoaks characters
Television characters introduced in 2010
Fictional people from Liverpool
Fictional waiting staff
Female characters in television
Fictional female businesspeople